Adrián Sanmartín Ayala (born 28 July 2005) is a Spanish professional footballer who plays as a forward for FC Cartagena B.

Club career
Born in La Puyola, Cartagena, Region of Murcia, Sanmartín began his career with hometown side FC Cartagena before joining Valencia CF in 2017. He returned to the Efesé in 2019, overcoming three serious injuries before making his senior debut with the reserves on 23 January 2022, playing the last five minutes in a 3–1 Tercera División RFEF home win over FC La Unión Atlético.

On 9 May 2022, Sanmartín renewed his contract with Cartagena. He made his first team debut on 26 September, replacing Jairo Izquierdo late into a 1–1 home draw against Deportivo Alavés in the Segunda División.

References

External links

2005 births
Living people
Sportspeople from Cartagena, Spain
Spanish footballers
Footballers from the Region of Murcia
Association football forwards
Segunda División players
Segunda Federación players
Tercera Federación players
FC Cartagena B players
FC Cartagena footballers